Madeleine Guitty (5 June 1870 – 12 April 1936) was a French stage and film actress.

Selected filmography
 The Mysteries of Paris (1922)
 Madame Sans-Gêne (1925)
 Montmartre (1925)
 600,000 Francs a Month (1926)
 Croquette (1927)
 Two Timid Souls (1928)
 Our Masters, the Servants (1930)
 Luck (1931)
 When Do You Commit Suicide? (1931)
 Lilac (1932)
 Aces of the Turf (1932)
 He Is Charming (1932)
 The Champion Cook (1932)
 A Star Disappears (1932)
 The Picador (1932)
 In Old Alsace (1933)
 The Faceless Voice (1933)
 The Bread Peddler (1934)
 Zouzou (1934)
 Little Jacques (1934)
 Madame Angot's Daughter (1935)
 A Rare Bird (1935)
 Fanfare of Love (1935)
 Excursion Train (1936)

References

Bibliography
 Crisp, Colin. French Cinema—A Critical Filmography: Volume 1, 1929-1939. Indiana University Press, 2015.

External links

1870 births
1936 deaths
French stage actresses
French film actresses
French silent film actresses
20th-century French actresses